Slaten is a surname. Notable people with the surname include:

Doug Slaten (born 1980), American baseball player
Troy Slaten (born 1975), American actor and attorney

See also
Slater (surname)